Clair de femme is a 1977 novel by Romain Gary. the basis for the 1979 French film Womanlight directed by Costa-Gavras.

References

1977 French novels
French novels adapted into films